Triemli may refer to:

 Triemli Hospital, a major hospital in the Swiss city of Zurich
 Triemli railway station, a railway station in the Swiss city of Zurich